Max is a Norwegian television channel designed for a mostly male audience.

The first program on Max was the movie Wild Hogs, followed by the premiere of Breaking Bad. The first week was watched by over 1 million viewers, making it the most successful launch of a Norwegian television channel since TV 2 in 1992.

In November 2010 Max bought the rights to Tippeligaen from NRK.

Programs
List of programs broadcast by MAX

Sports
Extreme sports
Dew Tour
X Games
Football
Tippeligaen
MMA
Bellator Fighting Championships

References

External links

MAX at LyngSat Address

Television channels in Norway
Television channels and stations established in 2010
2010 establishments in Norway
Warner Bros. Discovery networks